Yurberjen Herney Martínez Rivas (born 1 November 1991) is a Colombian boxer. He won a silver medal in the light flyweight division at the 2016 Summer Olympics. In June 2021, he qualified to represent Colombia at the 2020 Summer Olympics, but he decided that to be his last Olympiad in his career.

References

External links

 

1991 births
Living people
Colombian male boxers
Olympic boxers of Colombia
Boxers at the 2016 Summer Olympics
Medalists at the 2016 Summer Olympics
Olympic silver medalists for Colombia
Olympic medalists in boxing
Sportspeople from Antioquia Department
AIBA World Boxing Championships medalists
Central American and Caribbean Games gold medalists for Colombia
Central American and Caribbean Games silver medalists for Colombia
Competitors at the 2014 Central American and Caribbean Games
Competitors at the 2018 Central American and Caribbean Games
South American Games gold medalists for Colombia
South American Games medalists in boxing
Competitors at the 2018 South American Games
Boxers at the 2015 Pan American Games
Boxers at the 2019 Pan American Games
Pan American Games silver medalists for Colombia
Pan American Games medalists in boxing
Light-flyweight boxers
Central American and Caribbean Games medalists in boxing
Medalists at the 2019 Pan American Games
Boxers at the 2020 Summer Olympics
20th-century Colombian people
21st-century Colombian people